Bruce McMillan (born 1947) is an American author.

Bruce McMillan may also refer to:

 Bruce H. McMillan (born 1935), American politician
 Bruce McMillan (sport shooter) (born 1942), New Zealand sportsman

See also
 McMillan (disambiguation)
 McMillan (surname)